The 2018 Monte Carlo Rally (formally known as the 86e Rallye Automobile Monte-Carlo) was a motor racing event for rally cars that was held over four days between 25 and 28 January 2018. It marked the eighty-sixth running of the Monte Carlo Rally, and was the first round of the 2018 FIA World Rally Championship and its support categories, the WRC-2 and WRC-3 championships.

Reigning World Drivers' and World Co-Drivers Champions Sébastien Ogier and Julien Ingrassia were the defending rally winners. Their team, M-Sport Ford WRT, were the defending manufacturers' winners. Ogier and Ingrassis successfully defended their title to take their sixth win on the event, becoming the second most-successful crew in the event's history. The Škoda Motorsport crew of Jan Kopecký and Pavel Dresler won the World Rally Championship-2 category in a Škoda Fabia R5, while Italian privateers Enrico Brazzoli and Luca Beltrame won the World Rally Championship-3.

Background

Entry list
The following crews were entered into the rally. The event was open to crews competing in the World Rally Championship, World Rally Championship-2, World Rally Championship-3 and the French national rally championship as well as privateer entries not registered to score points in any championship. The final entry list included twelve crews competing with World Rally Cars, six in the World Rally Championship-2 and four in the World Rally Championship-3.

Route
The 2018 rally featured a heavily revised route from the 2017 event, with half the special stages being new additions. The 2018 rally included an additional  of competitive kilometres compared to the route planned in 2017. It featured a mix of new and returning stages in addition to stages that were reconfigured from previous years. The service park was based in the town of Gap, which also featured parc fermé facilities. The itinerary also featured a short stage called "Gap" that allowed the teams to conduct a pre-event shakedown before the ceremonial start in Monaco.

Details
The first two stages—including the famous stage between Sisteron and Thoard, which will be run in reverse as Thoard–Sisteron for the first time in the event's history—will be run on the night of 25 January before the crews return to the service park in Gap. The remaining six stages will be held on 26 January on roads to the west of Gap and features two passes over Vitrolles–Oze, which has featured on the route in previous years; and Roussieux–Eygalayes and Vaumeilh–Claret, both of which are new stages.

It features two passes over Agnières-en-Dévoluy–Corps and St.-Leger-les-Mélèzes–La-Bâtie-Neuve, both of which are heavily revised from previous years. The second leg concludes with a pass over Bayons–Bréziers, which was previously run on the first night of competition. After completing service in Gap, the cars return to Monaco.

The short Lucéram—Col St. Roch stage was replaced by a shortened version of La Bollène-Vésubie–Peïra Cava, which features the Col de Turini and was as the Power Stage in 2017. The new La Cabanette–Col de Braus stage, run as SS15 and again as SS17 will take its place as the Power Stage before the cars return to Monaco once more for the ceremonial finish.

Itinerary

Report

Pre-event
Jêromé Degout, who was due to compete as Bryan Bouffier's co-driver, was injured during shakedown. He was replaced by Xavier Panseri for the rally.

Thursday
The opening leg of the rally started on the evening of 25 January and featured two stages: Thoard–Sisteron and the first pass over Bayons–Bréziers. Conditions proved to be difficult as the forecasted rain and snow did not materialise; however, there were icy conditions on the roads in the first few kilometres of Thoard–Sisteron. Several crews struggled, with Thierry Neuville and Nicolas Gilsoul losing four minutes after sliding into a ditch. Ott Tänak and Martin Järveoja also spun, as did Sébastien Ogier and Julien Ingrassia; however, unlike Neuville and Gilsoul, both crews were able to recover quickly. Ogier and Ingrassia went on to win both stages to take the overnight lead ahead of Andreas Mikkelsen and Anders Jæger in second and Dani Sordo and Carlos del Barrio in third.

Friday
Defending world champion Sébastien Ogier led the rally despite he had a spun today and lost about 40 seconds. Ott Tänak, who was first represent for Toyota Gazoo Racing WRT in 2018 World Rally Championship, was second, 14.9 seconds off the pace. Andreas Mikkelsen, second overnight, conceded the position after overshooting a junction in the opening stage before retiring on the following liaison section with a broken alternator in his Hyundai i20 Coupe WRC. Team-mate Dani Sordo fell back to third and ended 59.7 seconds behind Tänak. Esapekka Lappi and Jari-Matti Latvala were fourth and fifth respectively to complete an impressive showing by the Japanese manufacturer. Thierry Neuville, who dropped over four minutes yesterday after sliding into a snow bank, moved up to ninth and set himself the target of a top-six finish.

Saturday

The Frenchman Sébastien Ogier had more than doubled that advantage to Ott Tänak come day's end, the figures do not paint the full picture of a see-saw scrap that at one point saw him more than a minute clear. Jari-Matti Latvala's cause was aided when his rival Dani Sordo crashed out of a podium position on Saturday's first stage. Esapekka Lappi in another Yaris as he moved up the order, with the younger Finn falling behind Britain's Kris Meeke when a mistake precipitated a puncture on SS11. Elfyn Evans sits sixth overnight in his Ford Fiesta, with Hyundai's similarly delayed Thierry Neuville recovering to seventh courtesy of a brace of stage wins on SS12 and SS13. Bryan Bouffier has slipped to eighth in the classification ahead of Citroën's Craig Breen, who suffered for being the "road-sweeper" through the snow of SS9. WRC 2 pace-setter Jan Kopecky completes the overall top ten.

Sunday
Five-time world champion Sébastien Ogier took the rally victory, recording their fifth win in the event. Ott Tänak and Martin Järveoja finished second, with teammate Jari-Matti Latvala and Miikka Anttila running out of the podium. The Power Stage this time was dominated by Kris Meeke, who salvaged some consolation for Citroën at the end of a troubled weekend with fourth overall – nearly three minutes behind Latvala – and five additional points. Hyundai star Thierry Neuville finished fifth and took four points from the power stage. Elfyn Evans and Esapekka Lappi were sixth and seventh overall, 1.0 second and 3.7 seconds behind the Belgian respectively. Bryan Bouffier came home eighth – the Frenchman losing time in a snow bank on SS16 – with Craig Breen ninth in the second Citroën C3, the Irishman never recovering from a significant time loss as the "snow plow" on Saturday morning. WRC 2 winner Jan Kopecky completed the final top ten.

Results

World Rally Cars

Classification

Special stages

Championship Standings

World Rally Championship-2

Classification

Special stages

Championship standings

World Rally Championship-3

Classification

Special stages

Championship standings

Notes

References

External links

  
 2018 Monte Carlo Rally in e-wrc website
 The official website of the World Rally Championship

2018
2018 World Rally Championship season
2018 in French motorsport
2018 in Monégasque sport
January 2018 sports events in France
January 2018 sports events in Europe